Richard Neer (born c. 1949 in Syracuse, New York) is an American disc jockey and sports radio personality who has been involved in, and has chronicled, key changes in both music and sports radio.

Biography
Neer began his radio career as a student at Adelphi University, from which he graduated in 1970. He worked at Long Island, New York's WLIR, where he was one of the early adopters of the freeform or progressive rock radio format.

In 1971, he joined the airstaff of progressive rock radio powerhouse WNEW-FM in New York City, where he worked as a disc jockey, doing mornings for eight years over three different eras. He was also program director for five years. For a while, Neer had a friendly relationship with Bruce Springsteen, who would call in to his late-night show, and played a part in bringing Springsteen's music to a wider audience. He witnessed the growth of the format and then its gradual shift into a more rigid, programmed, classic rock-driven product, a transformation he described in his 2001 book FM: The Rise and Fall of Rock Radio.

Concurrently, Neer began working as a sports radio talk show host at New York station WNEW-AM in 1987 and then at WFAN in 1988.  WFAN was the first and most visible of the successful all-sports format radio stations. Neer broadcast on the last day of music at WNEW-FM in 1999, then returned to that station for a bit after its switch to a "hot talk" format replacing the "Sports Guys" sports talk show hosting  "Sports in the Morning—powered by the FAN" up until the time the station started stunting CHR before its flip to Blink.

Neer remains at WFAN doing sports talk, working Saturday mornings and some nights. His call-in show was where Mets fans registered disapproval of the team's decision to run ads targeted at Latinos. He hosted New York Giants NFL broadcasts for several years.

Neer's unemotional style of speaking has prompted Bob Raissman, sports media reporter for the New York Daily News, to refer to Neer as "Sir Sominex," suggesting that his delivery is soporific.

Neer's brother Dan Neer is also a disc jockey.

In 2014, Neer published his first mystery novel, entitled Something of the Night.  He published his second novel, The Master Builders, on May 17, 2016. He released "The Last Resort" in May 2017.

Books

 Neer, Richard. FM: The Rise and Fall of Rock Radio. Villard, 2001. .
 Neer, Richard. Something of the Night, Amazon/Kindle eBook. 2014. 
 Neer, Richard. The Master Builders, Amazon/Kindle eBook. 2016.

References

Further reading
 Ridgewood News staff (October 29, 1975). "Village Players open with 'Blithe Spirit". The Ridgewood News.
 Leogrande, Ernest (June 13, 1976). "On the Record". New York Daily News.
 Feldberg, Robert (November 1, 1981). "Neer's ears pass station's songs". Asbury Park Press. pp. 9, 18.

External links

Living people
American radio personalities
People from Syracuse, New York
Adelphi University alumni
1949 births